WGSP (1310 kHz) is a commercial AM radio station in Charlotte, North Carolina, known as Latina 102.3 y 107.5.  It is owned by Norsan Media and broadcasts a Spanish-language Adult Contemporary radio format.  Programming is trimulcast on WGSP-FM 102.3 MHz and FM translator W298CF at 107.5 MHz. 

By day, WGSP is powered at 5,000 watts non-directional. But to protect other stations on 1310 AM, it greatly reduces power at night to 240 watts and switches to a directional antenna.  The radio studios are on East Independence Boulevard in Charlotte.  The transmitter is off Bellaire Drive, near West Brookshire Freeway (North Carolina Highway 16) in Charlotte.

FM Translator
In addition to the main station on 1310 kHz, WGSP programming is relayed to an FM translator.

History
On August 23, 1958, the station signed on as WKTC as a country music station. It was a daytimer station, required to go off the air at night. WKTC disc jockey Johnny Jacobs demonstrated that a person could live in a fallout shelter for a long period of time (which people during the Cold War feared they would have to do), spending a week there and contacting the station by phone.

1310 AM became Charlotte's first full-time Christian radio station, WHVN, in August 1971 around the time George H. Buck Jr. bought the station. As of 1980, about 65 percent of programming was "spoken word". When the 1240 frequency became available early in the 80s, allowing 24-hour broadcasts, WHVN moved from 1310, which only allowed a daytime signal.

WGSP ("Great Sounds of the Past") returned to the air as one of Charlotte's first oldies stations, playing a wide variety of standard pop hits and "beach music." In 1985, with no other area stations playing classic rock this small AM station became one of the first in the country to shape a format around vintage rock and roll from the 1960s and 1970s.  WGSP became the second most listened to AM station in the market.  At its peak, the WGSP air staff included Program Director Paul Ingles, Rick Ballew, Fielding Spicer, David Appleford, Phil England and Darby James.  After a couple of years of growth by WGSP, other FM stations in the region adopted the "Classic Rock" format and, with their better signals, WGSP lost audience and was sold to religious broadcasters.

WGSP became a gospel station and this format continued until 2004, when the switch was made to the current format. During 2006 and 2007, WGSP's programming aired on WGSP-FM, at 102.3 FM. Programs included "La Voz del Immigrante" ("The Voice of the Immigrant"). WGSP has simulcast the La Tremenda Network with WXNC.

References

External links
Listen To The Story Of WGSP as a Classic Rock Station
website

GSP (AM)
Regional Mexican radio stations in the United States
GSP (AM)
Radio stations established in 1965